Bottom-up proteomics is a common method to identify proteins and characterize their amino acid sequences and post-translational modifications by proteolytic digestion of proteins prior to analysis by mass spectrometry. 
The major alternative workflow used in proteomics is called top-down proteomics where intact proteins are purified prior to digestion and/or fragmentation either within the mass spectrometer or by 2D electrophoresis. Essentially, bottom-up proteomics is a relatively simple and reliable means of determining the protein make-up of a given sample of cells, tissues, etc. 

In bottom-up proteomics, the crude protein extract is enzymatically digested, followed by one or more dimensions of separation of the peptides by liquid chromatography coupled to mass spectrometry, a technique known as shotgun proteomics. By comparing the masses of the proteolytic peptides or their tandem mass spectra with those predicted from a sequence database or annotated peptide spectral in a peptide spectral library, peptides can be identified and multiple peptide identifications assembled into a protein identification.

Advantages
For high throughput bottom-up methods, there is better front-end separation of peptides compared with proteins and higher sensitivity than the (non-gel) top-down methods.

Disadvantages
There is limited protein sequence coverage by identified peptides, loss of labile PTMs, and ambiguity of the origin for redundant
peptide sequences. Recently the combination of bottom-up and top-down proteomics, so called middle-down proteomics, is receiving a lot of attention as this approach not only can be applied to the analysis of large protein fragments but also avoids redundant peptide sequences.

See also
Protein mass spectrometry
Shotgun proteomics
Top-down proteomics

References

Mass spectrometry
Proteomics